Oscar Theodore Horstmann (June 2, 1891 – May 11, 1977) was a Major League Baseball pitcher who played with the St. Louis Cardinals from  to .

External links

1891 births
1977 deaths
Major League Baseball pitchers
Baseball players from Missouri
St. Louis Cardinals players
Los Angeles Angels (minor league) players
Columbus Senators players
Kansas City Blues (baseball) players